Jacques Cariou (23 September 1870 – 7 October 1951) was a French show jumping champion. Cariou participated at the 1912 Summer Olympics held in Stockholm, where he won a gold medal in the individual jumping, a silver medal in team jumping with the horse Mignon, and a bronze medal in individual three-day eventing with the horse Cocotte.

References

Olympic gold medalists for France
Olympic silver medalists for France
Olympic bronze medalists for France
Equestrians at the 1912 Summer Olympics
Olympic equestrians of France
French male equestrians
1870 births
1951 deaths
Olympic medalists in equestrian
Sportspeople from Finistère
Medalists at the 1912 Summer Olympics